Osasu Igbinedion Ogwuche (born August 25, 1992) is the CEO of TOS TV NETWORK, a PanAfrican news network. She is a former Nigerian journalist and TV show host. She is the Chief Executive Officer of TOS TV Network and the former host of The Osasu Show, a syndicated TV show focused on development, business, and politics in Nigeria and the United Kingdom.

Early and personal life
Osasu was born in the United Kingdom into the prominent Igbinedion family. She is the daughter of Mrs Eki Igbinedion and Lucky Igbinedion, the former governor of Edo State, while her grandfather Gabriel Igbinedion is the Esama of the Benin Kingdom in Nigeria. Osasu obtained her bachelor's degree from Stonehill College in Easton Massachusetts and thereafter a master's degree from Northeastern University in Boston, Massachusetts. She later received a certificate in TV and Film Production from New York Film Academy in New York, New York in the United States of America.

Career
For 7 years (2015 -2022) Osasu was the host of the TV show The Osasu Show, which aired on African Independent Television, BEN TV London, 
and ITV which were popular TV stations in Nigeria and the United Kingdom and The Weekend Show on AIT. She is also the founder of The Osasu Show Foundation. She is the convener of Osasu Show Symposium, a forum where major stakeholders in the political field gathered together with their constituents to discuss issues of nation building and development especially as they relate to the welfare of the less privileged.

Osasu has received accolades for:
Journalistic Excellence by the Institute of Service Excellence and Good Governance (2017); Role Model to the Girl Child by Nigerian Entrepreneurs Award (2017) and Humanitarian Award by La Mode Magazine (2015)

Awards and recognition
 2016: West Africa Students Union Parliament Kwame Nkrumah - Exemplary Distinguished Leadership Honour 
 2017: The Institute For Service Excellence And Good Governance - Service excellence award for The Osasu Show Journalistic excellence

 2017: Nigeria Entrepreneurs Award - Role model to the Girl child.
 2018: Green October events award - Humanitarian of the year 
 2018: Nigerian Youth Advocacy For Good Governance Initiative Award 
 2018: The Girl's Show Nigeria  Award 
 2018: Emerging entrepreneurs multi-purpose cooperative society - Outstanding Innovation and Leadership Award 
 2018: Woman On Fire Abuja Awards- Seasoned professional of the year.
 2018: La Mode Magazine Green October Humanitarian Awards 
 2018: Global Race Against Poverty And Hiv/Aids In Conjunction With SDSN Youths Global impact ambassador award 
 2018: Paint My Face With Glamour, a compilation of Poems by Benjamin Ubiri in Honour of Osasu Igbinedion.
 2018: National Impact Merit Awards - Most outstanding TV personality of the year 
 2018: Nigeria Young Professionals Forum 2018 
 2018: DAAR Awards Prize 2018 - Young Achiever of the year  
 2019: The Difference Global Awards - Media personality of the year award 
 2019: Social Media For Social Good Awards Africa.

References

Further reading 
 

Nigerian television journalists
People from Abuja
New York Film Academy alumni
1992 births
Living people
Northeastern University alumni
Igbinedion family